The International Committee for Exhibition Exchange (ICEE) is a committee of the International Council of Museums (ICOM). It is a nongovernmental organization with formal relations to the UNESCO and functions as a forum for the dissemination of knowledge and experience about exhibitions.

The committee deals with many different aspects of exhibition development, circulation, and exchange. It also collects information about potential as well as existing travelling exhibitions. The ICEE holds meetings annually and has publications that offer solutions to the problems of organizing exhibitions.

See also
 Art exhibition
 Art gallery
 Curator
 National Touring Exhibitions
 Travelling exhibition

References
 ICOM — International Committee for Exhibition Exchange
 International Council of Museums (ICOM)

External links
 International Exhibitions Marketplace, known as WebArtEx
 Landau Travelling Exhibitions in the United States
 Smithsonian Institution Travelling Exhibition Service in the United States
 Swedish Travelling Exhibitions, Swedish government organization
 The Touring Exhibitions Group, U.K.-based organization
 IDEAS Touring Exhibition, International - U.K. based
Museum events
Exhibitions
Museum associations and consortia